The Nasdaq Composite (ticker symbol ^IXIC) is a stock market index that includes almost all stocks listed on the Nasdaq stock exchange. Along with the Dow Jones Industrial Average and S&P 500, it is one of the three most-followed stock market indices in the United States. The composition of the NASDAQ Composite is heavily weighted towards companies in the information technology sector. The Nasdaq-100, which includes 100 of the largest non-financial companies in the Nasdaq Composite, accounts for over 90% of the movement of the Nasdaq Composite.

The Nasdaq Composite is a capitalization-weighted index; its price is calculated by taking the sum of the products of closing price and index share of all of the securities in the index. The sum is then divided by a divisor which reduces the order of magnitude of the result.

Investing in the Nasdaq Composite
Index funds that attempt to track the Nasdaq Composite include Fidelity Investments' FNCMX mutual fund and ONEQ exchange-traded fund. Invesco offers the   exchange-traded fund, which matches the performance of the Nasdaq-100, a different index which tracks 101 of the largest non-financial companies in the Nasdaq Composite and is 90% correlated with the Nasdaq Composite.

Selection criteria
To be eligible for inclusion in the Nasdaq Composite, a security's U.S. listing must be exclusively on the Nasdaq stock market unless the security was dually listed on another U.S. market prior to 2004 and has continuously maintained such listing, and must be one of the following security types:
 American depositary receipts (ADRs)
 Common stock / ordinary shares
 Limited partnership interests
 Real estate investment trusts (REITs)
 Shares of beneficial interest (SBIs)
 Tracking stocks

Closed-end funds, convertible bonds, exchange-traded funds, preferred stocks, rights, warrants, units and other derivatives are not included in the index. If at any time a component security no longer meets the required criteria, the security is removed from the index.

Performance

Price history & milestones

The index was launched in 1971, with a starting value of 100.

On July 17, 1995, the index closed above 1,000 for the first time.

Between 1995 and 2000, the peak of the dot-com bubble, the Nasdaq Composite stock market index rose 400%. It reached a price–earnings ratio of 200, dwarfing the peak price–earnings ratio of 80 for the Japanese Nikkei 225 during the Japanese asset price bubble of 1991. In 1999, shares of Qualcomm rose in value by 2,619%, 12 other large-cap stocks each rose over 1,000% in value, and seven additional large-cap stocks each rose over 900% in value. Even though the Nasdaq Composite rose 85.6% and the S&P 500 Index rose 19.5% in 1999, more stocks fell in value than rose in value as investors sold stocks in slower growing companies to invest in Internet stocks.

On March 10, 2000, the index peaked at 5,132.52, but fell 78% from its peak by October 2002.

The index declined to half its value within a year, and finally hit the bottom of the bear market trend on October 10, 2002, with an intra-day low of 1,108.49. It remained down at least 50% until May 2007.

The index closed above 2,800 on October 9, 2007, and reached an intra-day level of 2,861.51 on October 31, 2007, the highest point reached on the index since January 24, 2001, before falling in the United States bear market of 2007–2009.

By February 6, 2008, the index was trading below 2,300.

On September 15, 2008, bankruptcy of Lehman Brothers led to a 3.6% drop in the index, its worst single-session percentage decline since March 24, 2003.

On September 29, 2008, the index fell nearly 200 points or 9.14% to fall beneath 2,000. Conversely, on October 13, 2008, the index gained nearly 200 points, more than 11%.

On March 9, 2009, the index reached a six-year intra-day low of 1,265.52.

The index closed 2012 at 3,019.51.

On November 26, 2013, the index closed above 4,000 for the first time since September 7, 2000. Although it still stood almost 20% below its all-time highs, the index set a new record annual close of 4,176.59 on December 31, 2013.

On March 2, 2015, the index closed above 5,000 for the first time since March 9, 2000. On April 23, 2015, the index set a new record closing high for the first time in 15 years, though it was still just short of the all-time intraday high set in 2000. 

On January 2, 2018, the index crossed 7,000 intraday. By December 24, 2018, the index had plunged to its yearly low at 6,192.

In 2019, the index rose 35.2%, closing for the year at 8,972.60 points.

During the 2020 stock market crash, on March 23, 2020, the index hit a low of 6,860. However, on June 9, 2020, the index traded above 10,000 for the first time. On August 6, 2020, the index reached a new all-time high above 11,000 and managed to close for the year at 12,888 points. 

In 2021, the index reached the milestones of closing above 13,000 and 14,000 in January and February respectively, and in November it closed above 16,000 for the first time.  

In 2022, the index plunged through the beginning of the year with it reaching an intraday low on June 16 at 10,565.14. It closed the first half of the year down 29.74%, the worst first half of the year in its history.

Returns by year

References

External links

Composite
American stock market indices